Mauro Mongiardo is an electrical engineer at the University of Perugia, Italy. He was named a Fellow of the Institute of Electrical and Electronics Engineers (IEEE) in 2013 for his contributions to the modal analysis of complex electromagnetic structures.

References 

Fellow Members of the IEEE
Living people
Academic staff of the University of Perugia
Italian engineers
Year of birth missing (living people)
Place of birth missing (living people)